The 7th Daytime Emmy Awards were held in 1980 to commemorate excellence in daytime programming from the previous year (1979). The seventh awards included a cameo appearance category, giving an award to a memorable soap cameo. Six awards were given.

The ceremony was telecast at 2:30 p.m. Wednesday, June 4 on NBC. It preempted Another World, which was a 90-minute program at the time. 

Winners in each category are in bold.

Outstanding Daytime Drama Series
All My Children
Another World
Guiding Light

Outstanding Actor in a Daytime Drama Series
James Mitchell (Palmer Cortlandt, All My Children)
William Mooney (Paul Martin, All My Children)
Douglass Watson (Mac Cory, Another World)
Franc Luz (Dr. John Bennett, The Doctors)
John Gabriel (Dr. Seneca Beaulac, Ryan's Hope)
Michael Levin (Jack Fenelli, Ryan's Hope)

Outstanding Actress in a Daytime Drama Series
Julia Barr (Brooke English, All My Children)
Kathleen Noone (Ellen Dalton, All My Children)
Beverlee McKinsey (Iris Carrington, Another World)
Kim Hunter (Nola Madison / Martha Cory), The Edge of Night)
Leslie Charleson (Dr. Monica Quartermaine, General Hospital)
Judith Light (Karen Wolek, One Life to Live)

Outstanding Supporting Actor in a Daytime Drama Series
Warren Burton (Eddie Dorrance, All My Children)
Julius LaRosa (Renaldo, Another World)
Vasili Bogazianos (Mickey Dials, The Edge of Night)
Shepperd Strudwick (Professor Timothy McCauley, Love of Life)
Ron Hale (Dr. Roger Coleridge, Ryan's Hope)

Outstanding Supporting Actress in a Daytime Drama Series
Francesca James (Kelly Cole Tyler, All My Children)
Deidre Hall (Dr. Marlena Evans, Days of Our Lives)
Lois Kibbee (Geraldine Whitney Saxon, The Edge of Night)
Elaine Lee (Mildred Trumble, The Doctors) 
Valerie Mahaffey (Ashley Bennett, The Doctors)
Louise Shaffer (Rae Woodard, Ryan's Hope)

Outstanding Cameo Appearance in a Daytime Drama Series
Eli Mintz (Locksmith, All My Children)
Hugh McPhillips (Hugh Pearson, Days of our Lives)
Kathryn Harrow (Pat Reyerson, The Doctors)
Sammy Davis, Jr. (Chip Warren, One Life to Live)
Joan Fontaine (Page Williams, Ryan's Hope)

Outstanding Daytime Drama Series Writing
 All My Children: Agnes Nixon; Wisner Washam; Jack Wood; Caroline Franz; Mary K. Wells; Cathy Chicos; Clarice Blackburn; Anita Jaffe; Kenneth Harvey
 One Life to Live: Gordon Russell; Sam Hall; Peggy O'Shea; Don Wallace; Lanie Bertram; Cynthia Benjamin; Marisa Gioffre
 Ryan's Hope: Claire Labine; Paul Avila Mayer; Mary Munisteri; Judith Pinsker; Jeffrey Lane 
 The Edge of Night: Henry Slesar; Steve Lehrman

Outstanding Daytime Drama Series Directing
 All My Children: Henry Kaplan; Jack Coffey; Sherrell Hoffman; Jørn Winther
 General Hospital: Marlene Laird; Alan Pultz; Phil Sogard
 The Edge of Night: John Sedwick; Richard Pepperman 
 Ryan's Hope: Lela Swift; Jerry Evans 
 Another World: Ira Cirker; Melvin Bernhardt; Robert Calhoun; Barnet Kellman; Jack Hofsiss; Andrew D. Weyman
 Love of Life: Larry Auerbach; Robert Scinto

Outstanding Game Show
The Hollywood Squares – A Heatter-Quigley Production for NBC
The $20,000 Pyramid – A Bob Stewart Production for ABC
Family Feud – A Mark Goodson-Bill Todman Production for ABC

Outstanding Game Show Host
Peter Marshall (The Hollywood Squares)
Richard Dawson (Family Feud)

References

007
D